Chen Chiu-ping (born 19 October 1974) is a Taiwanese judoka. She competed in the women's half-heavyweight event at the 1996 Summer Olympics.

References

1974 births
Living people
Taiwanese female judoka
Olympic judoka of Taiwan
Judoka at the 1996 Summer Olympics
Place of birth missing (living people)
Asian Games medalists in judo
Judoka at the 1998 Asian Games
Judoka at the 1994 Asian Games
Asian Games bronze medalists for Chinese Taipei
Medalists at the 1998 Asian Games
Medalists at the 1994 Asian Games
21st-century Taiwanese women